Kearsley is a town and an unparished area in the Metropolitan Borough of Bolton, Greater Manchester, England, and it includes the area of Ringley and the village of Prestolee.  The town contains 21 listed buildings that are recorded in the National Heritage List for England.  Of these, one is listed at Grade II*, the middle of the three grades, and the others are at Grade II, the lowest grade.  The Manchester and Bolton Railway was built through the area, and two railway bridges are listed.  Also passing through the area are the Manchester Bolton and Bury Canal, which is now disused, and the River Irwell; listed buildings associated with these are bridges, an aqueduct, and milestones.  The other listed buildings include a set of stocks, a house later used as a social club, two churches, a tower remaining from a demolished church, and a former spinning mill.


Key

Buildings

References

Citations

Sources

Lists of listed buildings in Greater Manchester
Buildings and structures in the Metropolitan Borough of Bolton